3C 109 is a Seyfert galaxy located in the constellation Taurus.

See also
 Lists of galaxies

References

External links
  Simbad
  www.jb.man.ac.uk/atlas/

Seyfert galaxies
Taurus (constellation)
109
2817533
11.18